Jean-Philippe Ruggia (born 1 October 1965 in Toulon) is a former Grand Prix motorcycle road racer from France. His best year was in 1995 when he finished in fifth place in the 250cc world championship. He won two races in 1993 riding for Aprilia and ended the season ranked sixth. He was also moderately successful in the 500cc class, finishing 8th overall in 1990. He is also the first rider known to use the elbow down riding style, years before Marc Márquez popularized the riding style in Grand Prix racing.

Motorcycle Grand Prix Results
Points system from 1969 to 1987:

Points system from 1988 to 1992:

Points system from 1993 onwards:

(key) (Races in bold indicate pole position; races in italics indicate fastest lap)

References 

1965 births
Living people
Sportspeople from Toulon
French motorcycle racers
250cc World Championship riders
500cc World Championship riders
Superbike World Championship riders
French people of Italian descent